The Islamic Councils, formerly known as the Provincial Societies are local councils which are elected by public vote in all cities and villages throughout Iran. 
Council members in each city or village are elected by direct public vote to a 4-year term.

According to article 7 of the Iranian Constitution, these local councils together with the Majlis (Parliament) are "decision-making and administrative organs of the State".

The councils are in charge of electing mayors, supervising the activities of municipalities;  study of social, cultural, educational, health, economic, and welfare requirements of their constituencies; the planning and coordination of national participation in the implementation of social, economic, constructive, cultural, educational and other welfare affairs.

Elections 
1968
1970
1972
1974
1976
1978
1979
1999
2003
2006
2013
2017

City councils

References 

Iranian Constitution Article 7:  https://archive.today/20060508013119/http://www.iranologyfo.com/low-e01.htm 
Overview of Iranian Political System:  https://web.archive.org/web/20060506125510/http://www.irtp.com/howto/partner/partner/chap1/chap1v.htm 
BBC News: Iran prepares for first-ever local elections:  http://news.bbc.co.uk/hi/english/world/monitoring/newsid_276000/276816.stm 
BBC News: Iran's women show political muscle: http://news.bbc.co.uk/1/hi/world/middle_east/289503.stm 
Article in The Iranian: http://www.iranian.com/Features/2003/February/Council/ 

Politics of Iran